The Steven Dean Memorial Trophy is a college football trophy that goes to the winner of the Catholic University of America and Georgetown University football game. The trophy was introduced in 1976 and is named after former Georgetown University team manager and Catholic University sports information director Steven Dean, afflicted with cerebral palsy.

Catholic and Georgetown had already met for 8 seasons (1966, 1967, 1968, 1969, 1970, 1971, 1973 and 1974) before the trophy introduction, and the rivalry was becoming the nation's capital own Holy War.

Catholic won the first trophy game 41–35 at Brookland Stadium and went on to win 9. Georgetown has won the trophy ten times, leaving the series 10–9.

After three straight Georgetown wins, the last game of the annual series was played in 1993, with Georgetown moving to Division I and Catholic still competing in Division III. The rivalry was renewed with a meeting in 2019, won 69–0 by Georgetown.

Game results

*Disputed

References

College football rivalry trophies in the United States
Catholic University Cardinals football
Georgetown Hoyas football